Christopher Eubanks (born May 5, 1996) is an American professional tennis player. He played college tennis for the Georgia Tech Yellow Jackets. There, he was a two-time All-American and twice named ACC Player of the Year. 
He has a career-high ATP singles ranking of world No. 102, achieved on 13 February 2023. In doubles, he achieved a career-high ranking of world No. 182 on 14 September 2020.

Early life and background
Christopher is the son of Mark and Carla Eubanks and has one older brother, Mark. He was coached regularly by his father until he was 13.

Eubanks became close friends with Donald Young and his family after they moved from Chicago to Atlanta. Around when he started high school, he began training with Young's parents, who run the South Fulton Tennis Center near where Eubanks lived. During this time, he also had the opportunity to practice with Young, who was already in the Top 100 of the ATP rankings. Eubanks credited these practice sessions with helping him get on track to become a professional. He has said, "When I got around Donald and got to get better and better, that’s when I got back to, "Maybe I could do this one day."

Prep career
Eubanks played three seasons for Westlake High School. In both 2011 and 2013, he helped his team win the region championship and become runners-up in the state.

In Juniors, Christopher earned a 48–6 overall record in 2013. He advanced six rounds in the USTA Nationals at Kalamazoo. He won the Georgia State Closed Junior Challenger. Eubanks was also a member of the winning team at the USTA National Boys' 18 Team Championships.

College career
Eubanks played three seasons at Georgia Tech before foregoing his senior year of eligibility to turn pro.

Freshman season
Eubanks played at the top of Tech's lineup in 18 of GT's 27 dual matches and was ranked as high as No. 53 nationally in singles. He had a 7–11 record at the first singles position, and defeated players nationally ranked as high as No. 5. He received an at-large bid into the NCAA singles championship where he beat 31st-ranked Nathan Pasha of the University of Georgia in the opening round. Eubanks was named Second-team All-ACC.

That summer, Christopher was granted a wildcard into both singles and doubles main draws of the BB&T Atlanta Open. In doubles, he teamed up with fellow Atlanta-native Donald Young. The pair won their opening-round and quarterfinals matches before falling in the semis to the world's No. 1-ranked doubles team–Bob and Mike Bryan. In singles, Eubanks fell to Radek Štěpánek in the first round.

Sophomore season
Playing much of the year at the top of Tech's lineup, Eubanks finished with a record of 34–7 in all singles matches, which was the second-most wins in one year in program history. In singles, he finished the spring ranked No. 8 nationally. He reached the semifinals of the USTA/ITA National Indoor Championship after earning a wild-card bid. He was named first-team All-ACC, ITA All-American, and ACC Player of the Year.

In August, Christopher competed again in the BB&T Atlanta Open. With a doubles wild card, he and Zach Kennedy (GSU top player and former Westlake High teammate) won their first round match in the main draw against Yoshihito Nishioka and Thiago Monteiro. In singles, Eubanks earned a spot in the main draw after defeating Monteiro in qualifying (6–4, 7–5).

Junior season

In his final season at Georgia Tech, Eubanks went 31–6 overall in singles–including 18 victories over ranked opponents. He reached his career-high national ranking of No. 4. For the second straight year, he advanced to the semifinals of the USTA/ITA National Indoors where he was awarded the USTA/ITA Sportsmanship Award–voted on by coaches and officials. Paired with Haley Carter of UNC, they won the mixed doubles title at the Oracle ITA Masters in Malibu, California. He earned his third-straight entry into the NCAA Singles Championship where he advanced to the quarterfinals before being defeated by the eventual champion, Thai-Son Kwiatkowski of Virginia. Eubanks received the National Div. I ITA/Arthur Ashe Leadership and Sportsmanship Award for the Southeast region and was again named ITA All-American and ACC Player of the Year.

For the third straight summer, he competed in the 2017 BB&T Atlanta Open. After earning a wildcard entry into the singles main draw, he reached the quarterfinals, earning his first two ATP singles victories including a three-set win over world No. 59 Jared Donaldson. A month later, he won his first US Open victory in doubles with partner Christian Harrison.

On October 23, 2017 Eubanks announced he would be turning pro and would not return for his senior season.

Professional career

2015-16: ATP debut
Eubanks made his ATP main draw singles debut at the 2015 BB&T Atlanta Open where he was defeated by Radek Štěpánek. The following year at the 2016 BB&T Atlanta Open, Eubanks lost to eventual semifinalist Reily Opelka.

2017: Turned pro, Major debut, first ATP wins & quarterfinal 
Eubanks had his professional breakthrough in the 2017 BB&T Atlanta Open, beating Taylor Fritz and Jared Donaldson to reach the quarterfinals. Shortly after the performance, Eubanks received a wildcard to the 2017 US Open where he was defeated in the first round by Dudi Sela.  At the same tournament, he also won his first US Open victory in doubles with partner Christian Harrison.

2020: First Major doubles quarterfinal at the US Open 
Partnering Mackenzie McDonald he reached his first Major quarterfinal in doubles at the 2020 US Open (tennis).

2022: First Grand Slam singles win 
At the 2022 US Open, he recorded his first Major win as a qualifier after defeating Pedro Martínez.

2023: Second Grand Slam win
He recorded his second Major main draw win at the 2023 Australian Open after defeating Soon-woo Kwon in five sets.
He reached a new career-high ranking of No. 102 on 13 February 2023 before qualifying into the main draw at the 2023 Delray Beach Open where he lost to lucky loser Aleksandar Vukic in the first round.

Challenger and Futures finals

Singles: 9 (4–5)

Doubles: 7 (4–3)

Singles performance timeline

Current through the 2023 Abierto Mexicano Telcel.

See also

 List of Georgia Institute of Technology athletes

References

External links
 
 
 Georgia Tech Yellow Jackets bio

American male tennis players
African-American male tennis players
Georgia Tech Yellow Jackets men's tennis players
Tennis players from Atlanta
1996 births
Living people
21st-century African-American sportspeople